"Real Live Woman" is a song written by Bobbie Cryner and recorded by American country music artist Trisha Yearwood. It was released in January 2000 as the first single and title track from her album Real Live Woman. The song reached #16 on the Billboard Hot Country Singles & Tracks chart in April 2000.

Critical reception
Deborah Evans Price of Billboard gave the song a favorable review, writing that Yearwood "has the pipes and, more important, the emotional substance to turn this into a soulful, torchy tribute to acceptance, love, and fulfillment."

Music video
The music video, depicting a peep show of "real live women" performing various everyday activities, was directed by Morgan Lawley and premiered in February 2000.

Chart performance

Year-end charts

References

2000 singles
2000 songs
Trisha Yearwood songs
Song recordings produced by Garth Fundis
MCA Nashville Records singles
Songs with feminist themes